This is a list of human rights activists who were enslaved by the Japanese Imperial Army as "comfort women" during World War II.

Several decades after the end of the war, these women demanded a formal apology and a compensation from the Government of Japan, with varying levels of success.

Dutch East Indies 
 Jan Ruff O'Herne (1923–2019)
 Ellen van der Ploeg (1923–2013)

Korea 
 Kim Hak-sun (1924–1997) 
 Song Sin-do (1922–2017)
 Gil Won-ok (吉元玉) (1928–)
 Kim Bok-dong (1924-2019)
 Lee Yong-soo (이용수) (1928–)
 Yoo Hee-nam (1927–) 
 Kim Kyung-soon (1926-2016) 
 Kim Soon-duk (1921–2004)

Taiwan 
 Liu Huang A-tao (1923–2011)

The Philippines 
 Rosa Henson (1927–1997)
 Walterina Markova (1924–2005)

See also
Comfort Women
Asian Women's Fund
Diary of a Japanese Military Brothel Manager
List of human rights activists
List of slaves
War rape
Statue of Peace

References 

Former
Comfort, former